Wankdorf Stadium  is a football stadium in Bern, Switzerland. The second largest all-seater football stadium in Switzerland, it is the home ground of BSC Young Boys. It was also one of the venues for UEFA Euro 2008.

History 

The present-day Stadion Wankdorf was built on the grounds of the former Wankdorf Stadium, which hosted the 1954 FIFA World Cup Final (The Miracle of Bern), and was then demolished in 2001. The new stadium has a capacity of 32,000 spectators, all seated. Integrated into the roof are solar panels with a yearly production of 1,200,000 kWh. The stadium was officially opened on 30 July 2005, although the first match in the new stadium had already taken place on 16 July 2005. Young Boys played against Olympique Marseille and lost 2–3 with 14,000 spectators watching. The match was considered an "infrastructure test", which is why no more than 14,000 tickets were sold.

The stadium was used by FC Thun for three Champions League home matches in 2005, and for one home match in the UEFA Cup round of 32 in 2006.

Fifteen years after the new stadium opened in 2005 (back then called Stade de Suisse), it was renamed Stadion Wankdorf in June 2020, in an effort to return to the stadium's roots.

Concerts

Bruce Springsteen performed at the stadium on 30 June 2009 as part of the Working on a Dream Tour in front of a sold-out crowd of 36,538 people.

AC/DC performed at the stadium on 8 June 2010 as part of their Black Ice World Tour and on 29 May 2016 during the Rock or Bust World Tour with Axl Rose as lead singer.

P!nk performed at the stadium on 10 July 2010 during The Funhouse Summer Carnival.

Muse performed a sold-out show at the stadium on 15 June 2013 as part of their The 2nd Law World Tour.

Bon Jovi performed at the stadium on 31 May 2006 during their Have a Nice Day Tour, in front of a sold-out crowd of 38,762 people. The band performed at the stadium for the second time on 30 June 2013 during their Because We Can, in front of a sold-out crowd of 28,868 people.

Depeche Mode performed at the stadium on 7 June 2013 during their Delta Machine Tour, in front of a sold-out crowd of 39,241 people.

One Direction performed at the stadium on 4 July 2014 during their Where We Are Tour.

On 15 July 2017, Celine Dion brought her Celine Dion Live 2017 tour to the stadium. She performed her sold-out show to 23,143 people, with a mixed set list of English and French.

On 5 June 2019 Rammstein performed in Bern during their Europe Stadium Tour 2019. The concert was sold out in several hours.

The Hot Seat 
A peculiar feature of the Wankdorf Stadium is the presence of a single, red seat (the other seats are black and yellow). This was the first seat installed at the stadium, on 20 January 2005, and the honour of unveiling it was given to former Young Boys player and manager Walter Eich. There are no tickets available for this seat; every game the seat is occupied by a notable personality, often with ties to Young Boys.

Ice hockey attendance record 

The Wankdorf Stadium with its artificial turf surface was an ideal candidate to provide Europe its first "new era" outdoor attendance record for ice hockey.
On 14 January 2007, the massive local rivalry of SC Bern and SC Langnau managed to fill the Stade de Suisse with 30,076 fans, an event which was sold out within 53 hours of tickets going on sale. These two rivals regularly fill SC Bern's home venue Bern Arena with over 17,000 spectators.

Matches

UEFA Euro 2008 
The stadium was one of the venues for the UEFA Euro 2008. The Netherlands played all three games at the stadium during the tournament:

International matches

See also 
List of football stadiums in Switzerland

References

External links 

 Stadion Wankdorf, bscyb.ch (in German)
 Events, bscyb.ch (in German)

UEFA Euro 2008 stadiums in Switzerland
Football venues in the Canton of Bern
Switzerland
Outdoor ice hockey venues in Switzerland
Buildings and structures in Bern
Sports venues in the Canton of Bern
Sports venues completed in 2005
2005 establishments in Switzerland
21st-century architecture in Switzerland